is an athletic stadium in Kanazawa, Ishikawa, Japan.

Ishikawa Prefecture Seibu Ryokuchi Park Athletic Stadium is an athletic stadium located in Seibu Ryokuchi Park in Kanazawa, Ishikawa Prefecture, Japan. It is also used as a ball game field. The facility is owned by Ishikawa Prefecture and is operated and managed by the Ishikawa Prefectural Fureai Public Corporation as a designated manager.

Major events and competitions
Athletics
Ishikawa Athletics Championships
Ishikawa Prefectural High School Track and Field Championships
All Japan Junior High School Correspondence Track and Field Tournament Ishikawa Prefecture

Soccer
Zweigen Kanazawa (J2) home games
Gamba Osaka official match (until 2010)
Emperor's Cup All Japan Football Championship

Rugby football
Japan Rugby Top League

Others
All Japan High School Athletic Conference (1985)
The 46th National Sports Festival (1991)

Facility overview
Japan Athletics Federation Class 1 Official Recognition
Track 400m × 9 lanes
Natural grass pitch
Large-scale video equipment
Night skiing lighting equipment: 4

Access
Bus
JR Hokuriku Main Line-Kanazawa Station West Exit Bus Terminal No. 2From the Hokuriku Railway bus "Shimoyasuhara" bound for "Fukurohata Seibu Ryokuchi Koen-mae", get off at "Fukurohata West Ryokuchi Koen-mae" and walk 5 minutes
JR Hokuriku Main Line-Kanazawa Station East Exit Bus Terminal No. 11From the Hokuriku Railway bus "Saiseikai Hospital"Bound for "Saiseikai Hospital"Get off at "Seibu Ryokuchi Park", walk 2 minutes
Automotive
About 15 minutes from JR Hokuriku Main Line / Kanazawa Station
Hokuriku Expressway-Kanazawa Nishi IC3-5 minutes(2 km).

Others
Zweigen operates a paid shuttle bus from Kanazawa Station Kanazawa Port Exit (West Exit) during home games.
Visit Zweigen website for further information

References

External links

  

Athletics (track and field) venues in Japan
Football venues in Japan
Sports venues in Ishikawa Prefecture
Zweigen Kanazawa
Buildings and structures in Kanazawa, Ishikawa
Sports venues completed in 1974
1974 establishments in Japan